Statistics of Primera Fuerza in season 1939-40.

Overview
It was contested by 6 teams, and Club España won the championship.

League standings

Moves
After this season Moctezuma and Selección Jalisco joined.

Top goalscorers
Players sorted first by goals scored, then by last name.

References
Mexico - List of final tables (RSSSF)

1939-40
1939–40 in Mexican football
Mex